A country is a distinct part of the world, such as a state, nation, or other political entity. It may be a sovereign state or make up one part of a larger state. For example, the country of Japan is an independent, sovereign state, while the country of Wales is a component of a multi-part sovereign state, the United Kingdom. A country may be a historically sovereign area (such as Korea), a currently sovereign territory with a unified government (such as Senegal), or a non-sovereign geographic region associated with certain distinct political, ethnic, or cultural characteristics (such as the Basque Country).

The definition and usage of the word "country" is flexible and has changed over time. The Economist wrote in 2010 that "any attempt to find a clear definition of a country soon runs into a thicket of exceptions and anomalies." Most sovereign states, but not all countries, are members of the United Nations.

The largest country by area is Russia, while the smallest is the microstate Vatican City. The most populous is China, while the Pitcairn Islands are the least populous.

Etymology
It most likely entered the English language after the Franco-Norman invasion during the 11th century.

Definition of a country

In English 
In English the word has increasingly become associated with political divisions, so that one sense, associated with the indefinite article – "a country" – is now frequently applied as a synonym for a state or a former sovereign state. It may also be used as a synonym for "nation". Taking as examples Canada, Sri Lanka, and Yugoslavia, cultural anthropologist Clifford Geertz wrote in 1997 that "it is clear that the relationships between 'country' and 'nation' are so different from one [place] to the next as to be impossible to fold into a dichotomous opposition as they are into a promiscuous fusion." 

Areas much smaller than a political state may be referred to as countries, such as the West Country in England, "big sky country" (used in various contexts of the American West), "coal country" (used to describe coal-mining regions in several sovereign states) and many other terms. The word "country" is also used for the sense of native sovereign territory, such as the widespread use of Indian country in the United States. The term "country" in English may also be wielded to describe rural areas, or used in the form "countryside." Raymond Williams, a Welsh scholar, wrote in 1975:

The unclear definition of "country" in modern English was further commented upon by philosopher Simon Keller:

Melissa Lucashenko, an Aboriginal Australian writer, expressed the difficulty of defining "country" in a 2005 essay, "Unsettlement":

In other languages 
The equivalent terms in various Romance languages (e.g. the French ) have not carried the process of being identified with sovereign political states as far as the English country. These terms are derived from the Roman term , which continued to be used in the Middle Ages for small geographical areas similar to the size of English counties. In many European countries, the words are used for sub-divisions of the national territory, as in the German , as well as a less formal term for a sovereign state. France has very many "" that are officially recognized at some level and are either natural regions, like the Pays de Bray, or reflect old political or economic entities, like the Pays de la Loire.

The modern Italian  is a word with its meaning varying locally, but usually meaning a ward or similar small division of a town, or a village or hamlet in the countryside.

Identification 

Symbols of a country may incorporate cultural, religious or political symbols of any nation that the country includes. Many categories of symbols can be seen in flags, coats of arms, or seals.

Name 

Most countries have a long name and a short name. The long name is typically used in formal contexts and often describes the country's form of government. The short name is the country's common name by which it is typically identified. The names of most countries are derived from a feature of the land, the name of a historical tribe or person, or a directional description. The International Organization for Standardization maintains a list of country codes as part of ISO 3166 to designate each country with a two-letter country code. The name of a country can hold cultural and diplomatic significance. Upper Volta changed its name to Burkina Faso to reflect the end of French colonization, and the name of North Macedonia was disputed for years due to a conflict with the similarly named Macedonia region in Greece.

Flags 
Originally, flags representing a country would generally be the personal flag of its rulers; however, over time, the practice of using personal banners as flags of places was abandoned in favor of flags that had some significance to the nation, often its patron saint. Early examples of these were the maritime republics such as Genoa which could be said to have a national flag as early as the 12th century. However, these were still mostly used in the context of marine identification.

Although some flags date back earlier, widespread use of flags outside of military or naval context begins only with the rise of the idea of the nation state at the end of the 18th century and particularly are a product of the Age of Revolution. Revolutions such as those in France and America called for people to begin thinking of themselves as citizens as opposed to subjects under a king, and thus necessitated flags that represented the collective citizenry, not just the power and right of a ruling family. With nationalism becoming common across Europe in the 19th century, national flags came to represent most of the states of Europe. Flags also began fostering a sense of unity between different peoples, such as the Union Jack representing a union between England and Scotland, or began to represent unity between nations in a perceived shared struggle, for example, the Pan-Slavic colors or later Pan-Arab colors.

As Europeans colonized significant portions of the world, they exported ideas of nationhood and national symbols, including flags, with the adoption of a flag becoming seen as integral to the nation-building process. Political change, social reform, and revolutions combined with a growing sense of nationhood among ordinary people in the 19th and 20th centuries led to the birth of new nations and flags around the globe. With so many flags being created, interest in these designs began to develop and the study of flags, vexillology, at both professional and amateur levels, emerged. After World War II, Western vexillology went through a phase of rapid development, with many research facilities and publications being established.

National anthems 
A national anthem is a patriotic musical composition symbolizing and evoking eulogies of the history and traditions of a country or nation. Though the custom of an officially adopted national anthem became popular only in the 19th century, some national anthems predate this period, often existing as patriotic songs long before designation as national anthem. Several countries remain without an official national anthem. In these cases, there are established de facto anthems played at sporting events or diplomatic receptions. These include the United Kingdom ("God Save the Queen") and Sweden. Some sovereign states that are made up of multiple countries or constituencies have associated musical compositions for each of them (such as with the United Kingdom, Russia, and the former Soviet Union). These are sometimes referred to as national anthems even though they are not sovereign states (for example, "Hen Wlad Fy Nhadau" is used for Wales, part of the United Kingdom).

Other symbols 
Coats of arms or national emblems
Seals or stamps
National mottos
National colors

Sovereignty and recognition 

When referring to a specific polity, the term "country" may refer to a sovereign state, a constituent country, or a dependent territory. A sovereign state is a political entity that has supreme legitimate authority over a part of the world. There is no universal agreement on the number of "countries" in the world since several states have disputed sovereignty status, and a number of non-sovereign entities are commonly called countries. 

By one application of the declarative theory of statehood and constitutive theory of statehood, there are 206 sovereign states; of which 193 are members of the UN, two have observer status at the United Nations General Assembly (UNGA) (the Holy See and Palestine), and 11 others are neither a member nor observer at the UNGA.

Some countries, such as Taiwan and the Sahrawi Republic, have disputed sovereignty status. Some sovereign states are unions of separate polities, each of which may also be considered a country in its own right, called constituent countries. The Danish Realm consists of Denmark proper, the Faroe Islands, and Greenland. The Kingdom of the Netherlands consists of the Netherlands proper, Aruba, Curaçao, and Sint Maarten. The United Kingdom consists of England, Scotland, Wales, and Northern Ireland.

Dependent territories are the territories of a sovereign state that are outside of its proper territory. These include the Realm of New Zealand, the dependencies of Norway, the British Overseas Territories and Crown Dependencies, the territories of the United States, the territories of Australia, the special administrative regions of China, the Danish Realm, Åland, Overseas France, and the Caribbean Netherlands. Most dependent territories have ISO country codes. In total there are 249 ISO country codes, including all 193 UN members and a number of other countries. Some dependent territories are treated as a separate "country of origin" in international trade, such as Hong Kong, Greenland, and Macau.

Patriotism 
A positive emotional connection to a country a person belongs to is called patriotism. Patriotism is a sense of love for, devotion to, and sense of attachment to one's country. This attachment can be a combination of many different feelings, and language relating to one's homeland, including ethnic, cultural, political, or historical aspects. It encompasses a set of concepts closely related to nationalism, mostly civic nationalism and sometimes cultural nationalism.

Economy
Several organizations seek to identify trends to produce economy country classifications. Countries are often distinguished as developing countries or developed countries.

The United Nations Department of Economic and Social Affairs annually produces the World Economic Situation and Prospects Report classifies states as developed countries, economies in transition, or developing countries. The report classifies country development based on per capita gross national income (GNI). The UN identifies subgroups within broad categories based on geographical location or ad hoc criteria. The UN outlines the geographical regions for developing economies like Africa, East Asia, South Asia, Western Asia, Latin America, and the Caribbean. The 2019 report recognizes only developed countries in North America, Europe, Asia, and the Pacific. The majority of economies in transition and developing countries are found in Africa, Asia, Latin America, and the Caribbean.

The World Bank also classifies countries based on GNI per capita. The World Bank Atlas method classifies countries as low-income economies, lower-middle-income economies, upper-middle-income economies, or high-income economies. For the 2020 fiscal year, the World Bank defines low-income economies as countries with a GNI per capita of $1,025 or less in 2018; lower-middle-income economies as countries with a GNI per capita between $1,026 and $3,995; upper-middle-income economies as countries with a GNI per capita between $3,996 and $12,375; high-income economies as countries with a GNI per capita of $12,376 or more.

It also identifies regional trends. The World Bank defines its regions as East Asia and Pacific, Europe and Central Asia, Latin America and the Caribbean, Middle East and North Africa, North America, South Asia, and Sub-Saharan Africa. Lastly, the World Bank distinguishes countries based on its operational policies. The three categories include International Development Association (IDA) countries, International Bank for Reconstruction and Development (IBRD) countries, and Blend countries.

See also

 City network
 Country (identity)
 Lists of countries and territories
 List of former sovereign states
 List of sovereign states and dependent territories by continent
 List of states with limited recognition
 List of transcontinental countries
 Micronation
 Princely state
 Quasi-state

Notes

References

Works cited

Further reading
 Defining what makes a country The Economist

External links
 The CIA World Factbook
 Country Studies from the United States Library of Congress
 Foreign Information by Country and Country & Territory Guides from GovPubs at UCB Libraries
 United Nations statistics division

 
Human geography